Fred Hicks is a game designer who has worked primarily on role-playing games.

Career
Fred Hicks discovered the Fudge role-playing game system while online and used it for his games based on Roger Zelazny's The Chronicles of Amber. Hicks had also been working with Lydia Leong, Rob Donoghue, and others to run LARPs at AmberCon NorthWest starting in 1999, and came up with the name Evil Hat for themselves. While on a trip to Lake Tahoe, friends Hicks and Donoghue developed a new game based on a conversation about running another Amber game and fixing some problems with Fudge; the result was Fate which Hicks and Donoghue would publish under the name Evil Hat. Donoghue and Hicks released a complete first-edition of Fate through Yahoo! Groups (January, 2003) then cleaned up the technical writing and slightly polished the system for a second edition (August, 2003). Hicks and Donoghue began work on the licensed Dresden Files Roleplaying Game in 2004, but publication was held up because he decided to use Spirit of the Century to introduce the Fate 3.0 system instead. While working on these other games, as a side-project he worked on indie RPG Don't Rest Your Head (2006), which would be Evil Hat's first published game. Hicks and Donoghue joined with Chris Hanrahan and Justin D. Jacobson to form the company One Bad Egg in 2008 to publish PDFs for Dungeons & Dragons 4th edition. Brennan Taylor of Indie Press Revolution hired Hicks as a part-time staff member; Ron Edwards felt that this resulted in an IPR which was less friendly to the small press that it was created to serve and left IPR. Hicks did layout for Cubicle 7's Starblazer Adventures (2008), and in the process offered much editorial work. Hicks also did layouts for the sixth edition of Hero System (2009). In September 2009, Hicks announced that One Bad Egg was closing down. Donoghue and Hicks were two of the nine authors who were ultimately writing for The Dresden Files Roleplaying Game, which was finally released in 2010. Hicks noted that VSCA Publishing's science-fiction game Diaspora (2009) was one of his favorites, and then got it into wider distribution by reprinting it through Evil Hat in 2010.

References

Indie role-playing game designers
Living people
Role-playing game designers
Year of birth missing (living people)